Treasure chests containing buried treasure are part of the popular beliefs surrounding pirates and Old West outlaws.

Treasure chest may also refer to:

 Treasure Chest (comics), a Catholic-oriented comic book published from 1946–1972
 Treasure Chest (Helloween album), 2002
 Treasure Chest (The Kingston Trio album), 1993
 Treasure chest (video games), chests containing various items, currency, and sometimes monsters in many video games
 Treasure Chest (The Seekers album), 1997
 Treasure Chest, a song from The Wiggles' album: Stories and Songs: The Adventures of Captain Feathersword the Friendly Pirate, 1993

See also 
 Treasure (disambiguation)
 Chest (disambiguation)
 Buried treasure (disambiguation)
 Treasure Box (disambiguation)
 Strong-box (disambiguation)